John van Bruggen (born March 6, 1957) is a Canadian animator and writer. His wife, Arna Selznick, was the director of 1985's The Care Bears Movie. He and Selznick were layout supervisors on its 1986 sequel. They are partners in the creative services company dancingmonkeys.

2020-2021: John is Executive Story Editor on the Brave Bunnies animated television series, currently in production.

2017-2018: John van Bruggen wrote the screenplay for The Most Magnificent Thing, the award winning  Nelvana 22 minute CG short directed by Arna Selznick.

In 2004, John created the Jazz-inspired show YTV's Coolman! along with Selznick. He also recently penned the script for the 2006 feature Franklin and the Turtle Lake Treasure.

He was nominated for a Gemini Award in 2000 for his story Franklin and the Two Henrys, also from the Franklin series. He received a second nomination in 2004 for Best Writing in a Children's or Youth Program or Series, for "Jacob Two-Two and the Purloined Hockey Card".

The "van" in his name is sometimes listed with a capital V in his animated credits.

Some of van Bruggen's other credits include:

 Miss Spider's Sunny Patch Friends (contributing writer)
 Gerald McBoing-Boing (contributing writer)
 Franklin (John was director for season 1 and 2 of the animated television series, writer on Back to School with Franklin, and director on Franklin and the Green Knight and Franklin's Magic Christmas) He also wrote a story, "It's Father's Day, Franklin!," for the CGI followup, Franklin and Friends. John wrote for the screenplay for the 2D 2006 feature animated film: Franklin and The Turtle Lake Treasure
 Little Bear (co-director, post production)
 Marvin The Tap-Dancing Horse (co-director)
 Dog City (director, season 1 and 2 of the television series)
 Beetlejuice (the animated series) (A. D., the premiere season, under director Robin Budd. John was also one of the three television series directors for Beetlejuice syndication)
 Noonbory and the Super 7 (contributing writer)
 PAW Patrol (guest writer)

References

External links

Biography of John van Bruggen
TV.com Person Entry

Living people
Canadian animated film directors
Animation screenwriters
1957 births